The Minister of Munitions was a British government position created during the First World War to oversee and co-ordinate the production and distribution of munitions for the war effort. The position was created in response to the Shell Crisis of 1915 when there was much newspaper criticism of the shortage of artillery shells and fear of sabotage.  The Ministry was created by the Munitions of War Act 1915 passed on 2 July 1915 to safeguard the supply of artillery munitions.  Under the very vigorous leadership of Liberal party politician David Lloyd George, the Ministry in its first year set up a system that dealt with labour disputes and fully mobilized Britain's capacity for a massive increase in the production of munitions.

The government policy, according to historian J. A. R. Marriott, was that:
 No private interest was to be permitted to obstruct the service, or imperil the safety, of the State. Trade Union regulations must be suspended; employers' profits must be limited, skilled men must fight, if not in the trenches, in the factories; man-power must be economized by the dilution of labour and the employment of women; private factories must pass under the control of the State, and new national factories be set up. Results justified the new policy: the output was prodigious; the goods were at last delivered.

Wartime role

David Lloyd George gained a heroic reputation with his energetic work as Minister of Munitions, from 1915 to 1916, setting the stage for his political rise. When the Shell Crisis of 1915 dismayed public opinion, with the news that the Army was running short of artillery ammunition, demands arose for a strong leader to take charge of munitions production. A new coalition ministry was formed in May 1915 and Lloyd George was made Minister of Munitions, in a new department created to solve the munitions shortage.

In this position David Lloyd George addressed labour disputes on the Clyde, concerning lowering of wages by 'dilution' of skilled labour, and he called for an enquiry into the conditions of munitions workers that led to labour intelligence services being transferred to his Ministry, under Colonel Arthur Lee, Parliamentary Military Secretary. He received acclaim for a big rise in output of munitions, which greatly contributed to his political ascent to Prime Minister in late 1916 and leadership of the five man War Cabinet. Many historians agree that he boosted national morale and focused attention on the urgent need for greater output but many also say the increase in munitions output from 1915 to 1916 was due largely to reforms already decided, though not yet effective, before he arrived. American historian R. J. Q. Adams provided details that showed that the Ministry broke through the cumbersome bureaucracy of the War Office, resolved labour problems, rationalized the supply system and dramatically increased production. Within a year it became the largest buyer, seller and employer in Britain.

To improve efficiency and public relations the Ministry opened a department focused on workers' welfare. It improved first aid conditions; promoted factory safety; handled medical conditions induced by the handling of dangerous chemicals and TNT; provided day care for children; limited overtime; and sometimes provided transportation and lodging for workers.

The Ministry was staffed at the top levels by senior army men and businessmen loaned by their companies for the duration of the war. These men were able to coordinate the needs of big business with those of the state and reach a compromise on price and profits. Government agents bought essential supplies from abroad. Once bought, the Ministry would control their distribution in order to prevent speculative price rises and to enable normal marketing to continue. The whole of the Indian jute crop, for example, was bought and distributed in this way. Steel, wool, leather and flax came under similar controls. By 1918 the Ministry had a staff of 65,000 people, employing some 3 million workers in over 20,000 factories with large numbers of women new to engineering work for the duration of the war. The post was abolished in 1921, as part of a cutback of government and as a delayed result of the Armistice in 1918.

Ministers of Munitions, 1915–1921

Parliamentary Secretaries to the Ministry of Munitions, 1916–1919

Parliamentary and Financial Secretaries to the Ministry of Munitions, 1918–1921

References

Further reading
 Adams, R. J. Q. Arms and the Wizard: Lloyd George and the Ministry of Munitions, 1915–1916 (London: Cassell, 1978) OCLC 471710656.
 Arnold, Anthony J. "‘A paradise for profiteers’? The importance and treatment of profits during the First World War." Accounting History Review 24.2-3 (2014): 61-81.
 Beiriger, Eugene Edward. Churchill, Munitions and Mechanical Warfare (NY: Peter Lang, 1997) . On Churchill role heading the Ministry
 Burk, Kathleen. Britain, America and the Sinews of War, 1914–1918 (NY: Allen & Unwin, 1985) .
 Clegg, Hugh Armstrong. A History of British Trade Unions since 1889: Volume II 1911-1931 (1985) pp 118-212.
 Gilbert, Bentley.  David Lloyd George: Organizer of Victory 1912–1916 (Batsford, 1992), pp. 209–250
 Grigg, John. Lloyd George: From Peace to War 1912–1916 (Eyre Methuen, 1985) pp. 223–256
 Hay, Denys. "IV. The Official History Of The Ministry Of Munitions." Economic History Review (1944) 14#2 pp. 185–190. in JSTOR ISSN 0013-0117.
 Hill, L. Brooks. "David Lloyd George as minister of munitions: A study of his speaking tour of industrial centers." Southern Journal of Communication (1971) 36#4 pp. 312–323.
 Lloyd-Jones, Roger, and Myrddin John Lewis. Arming the Western Front: War, Business and the State in Britain 1900–1920 (Routledge, 2016). online review
 Marriner, Sehila. "The Ministry of Munitions 1915–1919 and government accounting procedures." Accounting and Business Research vol 10. sup1 (1980), pp. 130–142. ISSN 0001-4788.
 Woollacott, Angela. On her their lives depend: munitions workers in the Great War (U of California Press, 1994) .

Primary sources

 Lloyd George, David. War Memoirs (2nd ed. 1934) vol 1 ch 9. 19

United Kingdom in World War I
1915 establishments in the United Kingdom
1921 disestablishments in the United Kingdom
Defunct ministerial offices in the United Kingdom
Munitions